Epi Fernández Berridi  (23 April 1919 – 12 June 1977) is a Spanish former footballer who played as forward for the Spanish  club Valencia of La Liga.

References

External links
 

1919 births
1977 deaths
People from San Sebastián
La Liga players
Spain international footballers
Spanish footballers
Association football forwards
Basque Country international footballers
Real Sociedad footballers
Valencia CF players